Winnipeg General Hospital is a hospital that was founded in 1872 in Winnipeg, Manitoba. It was built on the estate of Andrew McDermot. The driving force behind the hospital was McDermott's son-in-law Andrew Bannatyne.

The hospital is part of the Health Sciences Centre, one of the largest hospitals in Canada.

Dr. Edward Benson
One of the founders of Winnipeg General Hospital was Dr. Edward Benson (1843–1904).

Born in Peterborough, Ontario, son of Colonel J. R. Benson and Catherine Lee, he studied medicine at Louisville, Kentucky during the United States Civil War. Later he went to New York's Bellevue Hospital where he passed his final examinations before he was 21 years old. Returning to Canada he received a Canadian medical diploma at Toronto, and practised at Peterborough and Lindsay, Ontario.

Benson came to Winnipeg in 1874 following his brothers (Lieutenant James Benson) who was with the Wolseley Expedition.
James Lee Benson (1849–1926) He was also an early Dentist practitioner. Born at Peterborough, Ontario in March 1849, he returned to Winnipeg around 1881 and began a dental practice. He was the first elected President of the Manitoba Dental Association. He went to the Yukon during the Klondike Gold Rush and remained at Dawson City for seven years. He died at Winnipeg on 3 July 1926, survived by a son and three daughters. He was buried in Old Kildonan Cemetery.
Sources:

In addition to private practice Dr. Benson was city jail surgeon for 25 years, Coroner for Winnipeg, medical officer for the Deaf and Dumb Institute, and one of the founders of Winnipeg General Hospital. He was a member of the School Board for more than a decade. He was a Conservative, a Mason, an Odd Fellow, and a member of the board of trustees of Grace Church from its inception. In 1877, he was a member of the First Convocation of the University of Manitoba.

He married Annie Campbell in 1874, and had three sons: John Robinson Benson (1876-?), Edward Campbell Benson (1878-?), and Henry Lorne Benson (1879-?).

He died at Winnipeg on 26 August 1904. He is commemorated by Benson Avenue in Winnipeg.

Notes

Sources
The Story of Manitoba by F. H. Schofield, Winnipeg: The S. J. Clarke Publishing Company, 1913
Pioneers and Early Citizens of Manitoba, Winnipeg: Manitoba Library Association, 1971

Hospitals in Winnipeg
Hospitals established in 1872
1872 establishments in Manitoba
Downtown Winnipeg